The Italian Military Information Service (or SIM) was the military intelligence organization for the Royal Army (Regio Esercito) of the Kingdom of Italy (Regno d'Italia) from 1925 until 1946, and of the Italian Republic until 1949. The SIM was Fascist dictator Benito Mussolini's equivalent to the German Abwehr. In the early years of the war, the SIM scored important intelligence successes. Rommel’s successful military operations in North Africa in 1942 were substantially facilitated by the SIM through the securing of the U.S. Black Code used by Colonel Bonner Fellers to communicate plans for British military operations to his Headquarters in Washington.

SIM had a large, well-organized cryptologic group, Section 5 (Sezione 5). Section 5 produced codes and ciphers for the Royal Army and higher level enciphered codes for the Italian Royal Navy. Italian SIM was highly efficient and even compared favourably with its German counterpart. According to Brigadier Edgar Williams, Montgomery's Chief Intelligence Officer, the Italians “made far more intelligent deductions from the information they received than did the Germans.”

History 
The Servizio Informazioni Militari was instituted in October 1925 under the Fascist regime. Its activity was supported by the Air Force Information Service (Servizio Informazioni Aeronautiche, SIA) and the Navy Secret Information Service (Servizio Informazioni Segrete, SIS). The SIM had its headquarters at Forte Braschi, in the Quarter Q. XIV Trionfale, within the Municipio XIV. Within ten years, SIM evolved from a purely military intelligence and counter-intelligence service into a modern comprehensive structure capable of offering full intelligence coverage on domestic and overseas issues. On February 6, 1927, it was placed directly under the head of the High Command and charged with responsibility for internal and external security for all three armed forces. In 1934 funds available to the new service were doubled, as also was the number of specialised sections and personnel.

During the second half of 1930s the activities of SIM, in particular under the leadership of Mario Roatta, took a rather sinister direction: SIM was implicated in an impressive chain of crimes and acts of violence, including the assassination of the most active anti-Fascist exile, Carlo Rosselli, together with his brother Nello, on 9 June 1937. SIM was also behind the assassination in Marseille of King Alexander of Yugoslavia and French Foreign Minister Louis Barthou. 

SIM experienced its greatest interwar successes during the Ethiopian Campaign and the Spanish Civil War, managing to cut off the flow of arms to both Ethiopia and the Spanish Republic and providing the Italian command with a complete picture of the enemy forces.

Shortly before Italy's entry into World War II, Brigadier general Giacomo Carboni, chief of the SIM, wrote a series of reports to Benito Mussolini wherein the Italian preparation to the war was described as inadequate. Carboni drafted pessimistic reports on Italian and German military capabilities. As a result Carboni was dismissed from his post at the SIM.

During the war SIM, whose sphere of action was generally limited to military objectives, is credited with operational efficiency. This included the forecasting of the Allied landing in North Africa, a contingency not considered by the Abwehr. However, this service often was not consulted by Mussolini and the military hierarchy.

SIM was dissolved in 1944 and was replaced for a few years by a small intelligence office within the General Staff. Only in 1949 did the Allies allow the service to be re-established as SIFAR [Armed Forces Intelligence Service].

After the Armistice, many SIM  agents continued to work on behalf of the Kingdom of the South and of the Italian resistance. SIM spy Rodolfo Siviero coordinated the Italian partisans' intelligence activities from the Jewish art historian Giorgio Castelfranco's house on the Lungarno Serristori in Florence (now the Casa Siviero museum). Today he is known mainly for his role in the recovery of artworks stolen from Italy during the Second World War as part of the 'Nazi plunder'.

Intra-Axis co-operation 
In 1938 General Gamba, chief of the SIM Cryptographic Bureau, requested cooperation in the cryptanalytic field at the Cipher Department of the High Command of the Wehrmacht (OKW/Chi). The Germans agreed to share results on French diplomatic and military systems. This collaboration was expanded and provided the Germans with important cryptologic material like the U.S. Military Intelligence code. OKW/Chi had previously worked hard on solving the code, but had set it aside as too difficult. The Servizio Informazioni Militare provided also OKW/Chi with a captured Swedish diplomatic codebook and with a Turkish code that Chi was trying hard to break. There was less cooperation between SIM and the Abwehr on the working level. The SIM did not trust the Abwehr to honor agreements such as not to run clandestine networks in Italy. They monitored German intelligence activities and agents in Italy. Nor were the Germans apprised of any of the doubling of Allied agents which SIM conducted with great success. As the war went on relations became strained since the Germans came to distrust the Italians. After the Fall of the Fascist regime in Italy when Benito Mussolini was deposed on 24–25 July 1943, the Servizio Informazioni Militare turned to OKW/Chi for help and cooperation. Generaloberst Alfred Jodl, however, forbade any further liaison, and from that point on, no agency contact was made or material exchanged.

During the war SIM also cooperated with other Axis intelligence agencies, including those of Japan, Finland and Hungary. At regular intervals, technological and information exchanges occurred at the Penang submarine-base in Japanese-occupied Malaya, which served Axis submarine forces of the Italian Italian Regia Marina, German Kriegsmarine and Imperial Japanese Navy. The Hungarians maintained liaison officers in Rome and made the results of their work available to the Italians.

Human rights abuses 
SIM elements committed a whole series of crimes. On the direct order of Mussolini SIM arranged the assassination of the Rosselli brothers. The murder was carried out by French fascist-leaning and anti-communist Cagoulards, in exchange for 100 semiautomatic Beretta rifles and the promise of future shipments. Before the start of the Second Italo-Ethiopian War SIM supplied Ethiopians with faulty gas masks. During the Spanish Civil War it sunk Spanish Republican ships by loading explosives in the holds and it introduced bacteria in food destined for Spain in order to spread epidemics.

Organization
SIM was subordinate to the Deputy Chief of Staff of the Army for the performance of strictly military functions and to the Undersecretary of War for the performance of duties of a non military nature. SIM had five major sections:

 Sezione Calderini (espionage)
 Sezione Bonsignore Calderini (counterespionage)
 special services (sabotage and assassination)
 cryptology
 assessments

In 1934 Mussolini doubled SIM's budget to fund a greatly expanded effort against Great Britain and to permit SIM to add assassination and subversion to its activities. During World War II SIM had over 300 officers, 1,200 noncommissioned officers and specialists, and directed the activities of more than 9,000 secret agents spread abroad.

Pre-war operations 
SIM was very active in the interwar period. It oversaw support for Croatian Ustaše and Macedonian nationalists in Yugoslavia and arranged the assassination of Alexander I of Yugoslavia during a visit to France (1934).

By the mid-1930s Italian counterespionage, led by Colonel Santo Emanuele, had been involved in France through the Cagoule, taking advantage with great skill in the opportunities this provided to penetrate the Deuxième Bureau. Information obtained by SIM in France enabled Italian authorities to arrest the members of a French spy ring in Italy in 1939.

Before the Ethiopian campaign SIM secured the text of the secret Hoare–Laval Pact, which sanctioned an Anglo-French agreement for the partition of Ethiopia among France, Britain and Italy on the eve of the Second Italo-Ethiopian War. The surfacing of the draft of this pact brought about its failure and the resignation of both Samuel Hoare and Pierre Laval and the subsequent start of unilateral Italian military operation for the conquest of Ethiopia. A. J. P. Taylor argued that it was the event that "killed the League of Nations".

In 1936 Emilio Faldella, head of the special SIM section for East Africa (AO), infiltrated Palestinian agent Jacir Bey in Negus Haile Selassie's entourage. Jacir Bey offered to persuade the Emperor to reach a peace agreement with Italy, effectively turning Ethiopia into an Italian protectorate; the plan, however, never materialized.

During World War II 

The biggest Italian intelligence victory scored during World War II was the acquisition of U.S. encipherment tables obtained through the break in of the U.S. Embassy in Rome in September 1941 authorized by General Cesare Amè, head of the SIM. These tables were used by U.S. Ambassadors worldwide to communicate back to Washington, D.C. In October 1940, Colonel Bonner Fellers was assigned as military attaché to the U.S. embassy in Egypt and was to report to his American superiors the details of British military activities in the Mediterranean Theater of Operations. The British, hoping to eventually get the Americans into the war against the Axis powers, were very accommodating to Fellers giving him nearly full access to British operations in North Africa. Fellers, who was something of an Anglophobe, usually authored his dispatches in a less than favorable manner casting great doubt about the long term success of the British and her Commonwealth allies fight against the Italo-German army in North Africa. His reports were read by Franklin D. Roosevelt, the head of American intelligence, and the Joint Chiefs of Staff. Using the encipherment tables the Italian SIM was able to decipher Fellers’ communiques with Washington in a matter of hours often gleaning important information about the British in North Africa such as its current positions, sustained losses, expected reinforcements, current supply situation, future plans, morale, etc. which it quickly reported to the Italian and German military in North Africa. The leak ended on June 29, when Fellers switched to the new U.S. code system. During the 8 months or so of reading Fellers’ dispatches to Washington, Rommel would refer to Fellers as “die gute Quelle” (the good source). 

Shortly before the start of World War II SIM had broke Yugoslav military codes. When, in April 1941, Italian forces were threatened by a planned Yugoslav strike, SIM operators sent coded messages to the Yugoslav divisions, ordering them to postpone the scheduled offensive and return to their start-lines. By the time the Yugoslavs realised they had been duped, the Italian defences had been restored. During the occupation of Yugoslavia, the SIM turned its attention to the communications of partisan groups and by mid 1943 had solved two systems used by the Chetniks and one used by Tito’s Partisans.

SIM played an important role in Italian guerrilla war in Ethiopia. Francesco De Martini, captain of the SIM, was one of the leaders of Italian insurgency in East Africa. In January 1942, he blew up an ammunition depot in Massaua, Eritrea and later organized a group of Eritrean sailors (with small boats called sambuco) in order to identify, and notify Rome with his radio, of the Royal Navy movements throughout the Red Sea until he was captured at Dahlak Kebir in August 1942. 

On 18 May 1942, Maltese irredentist and SIM spy Carmelo Borg Pisani was sent on an espionage mission to Malta, to check British defences and help prepare for the planned Axis invasion of the island (Operazione C3). Borg Pisani was recognized by one of his childhood friends, Cpt. Tom Warrington, who denounced him. British Intelligence kept him under arrest in a house in Sliema till August. He was then transferred to Corradino prison, accused of treason. On 12 November 1942 he stood trial under closed doors in front of three judges, headed by Chief Justice of Malta Sir George Borg, and defended by two lawyers. His plea that he had renounced British citizenship by returning his passport and acquisition of Italian citizenship (which would have granted him status of prisoner of war) was not upheld by the military court. On 19 November 1942 he was publicly sentenced to death for espionage, for taking up arms against the Government and forming part of a conspiracy to overthrow the government. His execution by hanging took place at 7:30AM on Saturday, 28 November, 1942. Borg Pisani was posthumously awarded the Gold Medal of Military Valor, the highest Italian military award, by King Victor Emmanuel III a few days after his death. 

SIM had a very effective cryptanalytic department that attacked foreign crypto-systems. This section was headed by General Vittorio Gamba, a published student of cryptology who had been breaking codes since World War I, and was located in Rome. On average 8.000 messages were intercepted each month, 6.000 were studied and out of these 3.500 translated. The codes of several countries were attacked including France, Turkey, Romania, United States, Britain and the Vatican.

Chiefs

See also
 History of espionage
 Italian intelligence agencies
 OVRA: the secret police of Fascist Italy.
 La Cagoule: French fascist-leaning and anti-communist terrorist group that regularly collaborated with SIM.
 Kenpeitai: the military police arm of the Imperial Japanese Army from 1881 to 1945.
 Tokubetsu Keisatsutai: the Imperial Japanese Navy's military police.
 Wilhelm Franz Canaris: a German admiral and the chief of the Abwehr from 1935 to 1944.

References

Notes

Bibliography

 
 
 
 
 
 
 
 
 
 
 
 
 
 
 

Military intelligence agencies
Intelligence services of World War II
Counterintelligence agencies
1925 establishments in Italy
Government agencies established in 1925
Government agencies disestablished in 1949
Defunct intelligence agencies